The 1986 WCHA Men's Ice Hockey Tournament was the 27th conference playoff in league history and 34th season where a WCHA champion was crowned. The tournament was played between February 28 and March 15, 1986. First round and semifinal games were played at home team campus sites while the championship match was held at the DU Arena in Denver, Colorado. By winning the tournament, Denver was awarded the Broadmoor Trophy and received the WCHA's automatic bid to the 1986 NCAA Division I Men's Ice Hockey Tournament.

Format
All member teams were eligible for the tournament and were seeded No. 1 through No. 8 according to their final conference standing, with a tiebreaker system used to seed teams with an identical number of points accumulated. The top four seeded teams each earned home ice and hosted one of the lower seeded teams. As a result of their being the regular season champion, Denver's home venue, DU Arena, served as the site for the Championship game regardless of which teams qualified for the penultimate match. Each series were two-game matchups with the team that scored the most goals advancing to the succeeding round. The teams that advanced to the semifinal were re-seeded No. 1 through No. 4 according to the final regular season conference standings, with the top remaining seed matched against lowest remaining seed in one semifinal game while the two other semifinalists meeting with the winners advancing to the championship round. The Tournament Champion received an automatic bid to the 1986 NCAA Division I Men's Ice Hockey Tournament.

Conference standings
Note: GP = Games played; W = Wins; L = Losses; T = Ties; PTS = Points; GF = Goals For; GA = Goals Against

Bracket

Teams are reseeded after the first round

Note: * denotes overtime period(s)

First round

(1) Denver vs. (8) Michigan Tech

(2) Minnesota vs. (7) Colorado College

(3) Wisconsin vs. (6) North Dakota

(4) Minnesota-Duluth vs. (5) Northern Michigan

Semifinals

(1) Denver vs. (4) Minnesota-Duluth

(2) Minnesota vs. (3) Wisconsin

Championship

(1) Denver vs. (2) Minnesota

Tournament awards
None

See also
Western Collegiate Hockey Association men's champions

References

External links
WCHA.com
1985–86 WCHA Standings
1985–86 NCAA Standings
2013–14 Colorado College Tigers Media Guide
2013–14 Denver Pioneers Media Guide
2013–14 Minnesota Golden Gophers Media Guide 
2012–13 Minnesota-Duluth Bulldogs Media Guide
2013–14 North Dakota Hockey Media Guide
2006–07 Northern Michigan Wildcats Media Guide
2003–04 Wisconsin Badgers Media Guide

WCHA Men's Ice Hockey Tournament
Wcha Men's Ice Hockey Tournament